Yama, also known as Kala, and Dharmaraja is the Hindu god of death and justice, responsible for the dispensation of law and punishment of sinners in his abode, Yamapuri. He is often identified with Dharmadeva, the personification of Dharma, though the two deities have different origins and myths.

In Vedic tradition, Yama was considered to be the first mortal who died and espied the way to the celestial abodes; thus, as a result, he became the ruler of the departed. His role, characteristics, and abode have been expanded in texts such as the Upanishads, the Ramayana, the Mahabharata and the Puranas.

Yama is described as the twin of Yami, and the son of the sun god Surya (in earlier traditions Vivasvat) and Sanjna. He judges the souls of the dead and depending on their deeds, he assigns them to the realm of the Pitris (forefathers), Naraka (hell), or be reborn on the earth. Yama is aided by the god Chitragupta, who keeps a record of every deed done by a man, and chief attendants—Chanda and Kalapurusha. Yama is featured in many legends, including those of the Pandavas, Savitri Satyavan, Nachiketa and Markandeya.

Yama is also one of the Lokapalas (guardians of the realms), appointed as the protector of the south direction. He is often depicted as a dark-complexioned man, riding a buffalo and carrying a noose or mace to capture souls. In modern culture, Yama has been depicted in various safety campaigns in India.

Etymology and epithets
The word "Yama" means 'twin' (Yama has a twin sister, Yami), and later came to mean 'binder' (derived from "yam"); the word also means  'moral rule or duty' (i.e. dharma), 'self-control', 'forbearance', and 'cessation'.

Yama is also known by many other names, including Kala ('time'), Pashi (one who carries a noose') and Dharmaraja ('lord of Dharma').

Identification with Dharmadeva
Yama and Dharmadeva, the god personifying the concept of Dharma, are generally considered to be one and the same person. Author Vettam Mani speculates a reason for this identification: 

Mani believes that Yama and Dharmadeva are two different deities, citing that the Puranic scriptures attest different myths about the deities — 
 Yama is the judge of the dead, while Dharmadeva is one of the Prajapatis (agents of creation).
 Yama is the son of sun god Surya and his wife Sanjna, while Dharmadeva is born from the chest of the god Brahma.
 Yama is married to Dhumorna. On the other hand, Dharmadeva is married to ten or thirteen daughters of Daksha.
 Yama has a daughter Sunita. Dharmadeva fathered many sons from his wives. He also fathered Yudhishthira, the eldest of the Pandavas.

Iconography

In Hinduism, Yama is the lokapala ("Guardian of the realms") of the south and the son of Surya. Three hymns (10, 14, and 35) in the 10th book of the Rig Veda are addressed to him. In Puranas, Yama is described as having four arms, protruding fangs, and complexion of storm clouds, with a wrathful expression; surrounded by a garland of flames; dressed in red, yellow, or blue garments; holding a noose and a mace or sword; and riding a water-buffalo. He holds a noose (pāśa) of rope in one hand, with which he seizes the lives of people who are about to die. He is also depicted holding a danda which is a Sanskrit word for "staff". Yama is the son of Surya and Saranyu. He is the twin brother of Yami, brother of Shraddhadeva Manu and the step brother of Shani and his son was Katila. There are several temples across India dedicated to Yama. As per Vishnu Dharmottara, Yama is said to be represented on a buffalo, with garments like of heated gold, and all kinds of ornaments. He has four arms with the complexion of rain clouds. Dhumorna, his wife, is represented sitting on the left haunch of Yama and she has the colour of a dark blue lotus.

Literature

Vedas

In the Rigveda, Yama is the son of a solar deity Vivasvat and Saraṇyū and has a twin sister named Yamī. He is cognate to the Avestan Yima, son of Vīvanhvant. The majority of Yama's appearances are in the first and tenth book. Yama is closely associated with Agni in the Rigveda. Agni is both Yama's friend and priest, and Yama is stated to have found the hiding Agni. In the Rigveda, Yama is the king of the dead, and one of the two kings that humans see when they reach heaven (the other being Varuna). Yama is stated to be a gatherer of the people, who gave dead people a place to rest. Out of the three Rigvedic heavens, the third and highest belong to Yama (the lower two belong to Savitr). Here is where the gods resides, and Yama is surrounded by music. In the ritual sacrifice, Yama is offered soma and ghee, and is invoked to sit at the sacrifice, lead the sacrificers to the abode of the gods, and provide long life.

In the dialogue hymn between Yama and Yamī (RV 10.10), as the first two humans, Yamī tries to convince her twin brother Yama to have sex with her. Yamī makes a variety of arguments, including continuing the mortal line, that Tvashtar created them as a couple in the womb, and that Dyaush and Prithvi are famous for their incest. Yama argues that their ancestors, "the Gandharva in the waters and the watery maiden," as a reason not to commit incest, that Mitra-Varuna are strict in their ordinances, and that they have spies everywhere. By the end of the hymn, Yamī becomes frustrated but Yama remains firm in his stance. However, by RV 10.13.4, Yama is stated to have chosen to leave offspring, but Yamī is not mentioned.

Vedic literature states that Yama is the first mortal, and that he chose to die, and then proceeded to create a path to the "other world", where deceased ancestral fathers reside. Due to being the first man to die, he is considered the chief of the dead, lord of settlers, and a father. Throughout the course of Vedic literature, Yama becomes more and more associated with the negative aspects of death and eventually becomes the god of death. He also becomes associated with Antaka (the Ender), Mṛtyu (Death), Nirṛti (Decease), and Sleep.

Yama has two four-eyed, broad nosed, brindled, reddish-brown dogs, Sharvara and Shyama, who are the sons of Saramā. However, in the Atharvaveda, one of dogs is brindled and the other is dark. The dogs are meant to track down those who are about to die, and guard the path to Yama's realm. Scholars who adhere to Theodor Aufrecht's interpretation of RV 7.55 state that the dogs were also meant to keep wicked men out of heaven.

The Vājasaneyi Saṃhitā (the White Yajurveda) states Yama and his twin sister Yamī both reside in the highest heaven. The Atharvaveda states Yama is unsurpassable and is greater than Vivasvat.

The Taittirīya Aranyaka and the Āpastamba Śrauta state that Yama has golden-eyed and iron-hoofed horses.

Upanishads 
In the Katha Upanishad, Yama is portrayed as a teacher to the Brahmin boy Nachiketa. Having granted three boons to Nachiketa, their conversation evolves to a discussion of the nature of being, knowledge, the Atman (i.e. the soul, self) and moksha (liberation). From the translation by Brahmrishi Vishvatma Bawra:

Mahabharata 

In the epic Mahabharata, Dharmadeva (who is identified with Yama) is the father of Yudhishthira, the oldest brother of the five Pandavas. Yama most notably appears in person in the  Yaksha Prashna and the Vana Parva, and is mentioned in the Bhagavad Gita.

Yaksha Prashna 
In the Yaksha Prashna, Dharmadeva (Yama) appears as a yaksha (nature spirit) in the form of a Crane to question Yudhishthira and test his righteousness. Impressed by Yudhishthira's strict adherence to dharma and his answers to the riddles posed, Yama revealed himself as his father, blessed him, and brought his younger Pandava brothers back to life. From the Yaksha Prashna article linked:

Vana Parva 
In the Vana Parva, when Yudhishthira asks the sage Markandeya whether there has ever been a woman whose devotion matched Draupadi's, the sage replied by relating the story of Savitri and Satyavan. After Savitri's husband Satyavan died, Yama arrived to carry away his soul. However, Yama was so impressed with Savitri's purity and dedication to dharma and to her husband, he was convinced to instead bring Satyavan back to life.

Tirtha-Yatra Parva
In the Tirtha-yatra Parva (Book 3, Varna Parva, CXLII), Lomasa tells Yudhishthira 'in days of yore, there was (once) a terrible time in the Satya Yuga when the eternal and primeval Deity [Krishna] assumed the duties of Yama. And, O thou that never fallest off, when the God of gods began to perform the functions of Yama, there died not a creature while the births were as usual.'

This led to an increase in the population and the Earth sinking down 'for a hundred yojanas. And suffering pain in all her limbs.' The earth sought the protection of Narayana, who incarnated as a boar (Varaha) and lifted her back up.

Udyoga Parva 
In the Udyoga Parva, it is stated that the wife of Yama is called Urmila.

Bhagavad Gita 
In the Bhagavad Gita, part of the Mahabharata, Krishna states:

Puranas 
Yama and his abode are frequently mentioned in the Puranas.

Bhagavata Purana / Srimad Bhagavatam

Third and Fourth Canto 
In the third and fourth cantos of the Srimad Bhagavatam, Yama was incarnated as a shudra called Vidura due to being cursed by a sage for being too harsh in his punishments. From the A. C. Bhaktivedanta Swami Prabhupada / Bhaktivedanta Book Trust (BBT) translation:

Vidura, a devotee of Krishna, is the main protagonist in the third canto. In this canto, after being thrown out of his home by King Dhritarashtra (his older half-brother) for admonishing the Kaurava's ignoble behaviour towards the Pandavas, Vidura went on a pilgrimage where he met other devotees of Krishna such as Uddhava and the sage Maitreya, the latter of whom revealed Vidura's true origin to him:

Krishna also states Yama punishes sinners, as relayed to Vidura (again, an incarnation of Yama) by Maitreya during their conversation about the origin and creation of the multiverse:

A detailed account of the punishment of a sinner upon their death is also provided, beginning with their seizure and journey to Yamaloka (i.e. Hell):

Sixth Canto 
In the sixth canto, Yama (not as Vidura nor with Aryama in the post; see third and fourth canto) instructs his messengers, the Yamadutas, when questioned about who has supreme authority in the universe since there are so many gods and demigods:

Tenth Canto 
In the tenth canto, Krishna and Balarama travel to Yama's abode to bring back the dead son of their Guru, Sandipani Muni:

Brahma Purana 
In the Brahma Purana, Yama is the lord of justice and is associated with Dharma. Mentions include:
 Chapter 2.29–30: Yama has a daughter called Sunita and a grandson called Vena, who turned his back on dharma
 Chapter 20: The various hells of Yama are described along with their concomitant sins
 Chapter 30.64–68: Yama chastises his mother for cursing him (to his father)
 Chapter 35.11: Yama is destroyed by Shiva after coming to claim the soul of Markandeya (and at the behest of the Gods is revived afterwards)
 Chapter 48.4: Krishna describes himself as Brahma, Vishnu, Shiva, Indra, and Yama ('I am Yama who restrains the universe.')
 Chapter 105: Descriptions of the 'terrible servants of Yama' are given
 Chapter 126.42.50: Descriptions of the agony of death for sinners including being caught by Yama with His noose, and the tortures suffered in His abode
 Chapter 24 (book 4): Yama is killed in battle by Karttikeya; on Shiva's orders, Yama is revived by Nandin

Garuda Purana 
In the Garuda Purana, Yama and his realm where sinners are punished are detailed extensively, including in the twelfth chapter called 'The Realm of Yama'. In this text, the name of Yama's wife is Syamala.

Matsya Purana 
In the Matsya Purana, In addition to his battles against the asuras, Yama is mentioned extensively:
 Chapter XI: Yama as boy is cursed
 Chapter XLIX: Yama fights Janamejaya in Hell and after being captured, gives him knowledge of emancipation
 Chapter XCIII: Yama is declared to be of Saturn
 Chapter CII: Synonyms of Yama are given (Dharmaraja, Mrityo, Antaka, Vaivaswata, Kala, Sarvabhutaksaya, Audumbara, Dadhna, Nila, Paramesthi, Vrikodara, Chitra, and Chitragupta)
 Chapter CCXLVIII: Yama – like others – is controlled by Vishnu
 Chapter CCLIII: Yama is 13th of the 32 Devas

Vishnu Purana 
In the Vishnu Purana, Yama is the son of sun-god Surya (named Vivasvan in the Vedas, also means 'sun') and Sandhya (named Saranya in the Vedas, is another name), the daughter of Vishvakarma (named Tvastar in the Vedas emerged from the navel of Vishvakarman). During a conversation with his servant, Yama states that he is subordinate to Vishnu. While establishing the relationship between Vishnu and Lakshmi, the Chapter 8 of Book 1 describes Dhumorna as Yama's consort.

Marriage and children
Varying information about Yama's consorts and children are found in Hindu texts. The Mahābhārata, the  Vishnu Purana and the Vishnudharmottara describe Dhumorna (also known as Urmila) as his consort. In the Garuda Purana, Syamala is the name of Yama's wife.  According to some other texts, Yama has three consorts—Hema-mala, Sushila and Vijaya. When identified with Dharmadeva, he also married 10 or 13 daughters of the god Daksha.

According to the Brahma Purana, the name of Yama's eldest daughter is Sunita, who is the mother of the king Vena. Sobhavati, the wife of Chitragupta, is sometimes mentioned to be Yama's daughter. In the Mahabharata, Yudhishthira, the eldest Pandava, was blessed by Dharma to Kunti.

In popular culture 
In addition to his depiction in movie and television adaptations of scriptures such as in the television series, Yama has also been depicted in road safety campaigns in India, particularly to warn against the dangers of riding motorcycles without helmets.
Dharma Raja has been depicted as a character in "The Star-Touched Queen" and "A Crown of Wishes" by Roshani Chokshi.

See also
 Kṣitigarbha
 Kalantaka
 Naraka
 Vaitarna River
 Yama (Buddhism)

Notes

References

Bibliography

 
  4 volumes
 
 

 
 
 
 
  2 volumes

Further reading
 Meid, W. 1992. Die Germanische Religion im Zeugnis der Sprache.  In Beck et al., Germanische Religionsgeschichte – Quellen und Quellenprobleme, pp. 486–507.  New York, de Gruyter.

External links

 Dying, Yamaraja and Yamadutas
 Yama's subordinance to Vishnu 

Lokapala
Death gods
Hindu gods
Justice gods
Death and Hinduism
Divine twins